The ash-breasted tit-tyrant (Anairetes alpinus) is a species of bird in the family Tyrannidae. It is found in Bolivia and Peru.

Its natural habitat is subtropical or tropical moist montane forests. It is threatened by habitat loss.

Taxonomy
The ash-breasted tit-tyrant's genus, Anairetes, is believed to be most closely related to the genera Mecocerculus and Serpophaga; however, there is no definitive evidence supporting this claim. Members of the genus Anairetes are known commonly as tit-tyrants because their active foraging behavior and crests are reminiscent of the true tits in the family Paridae.

References

Cited texts

External links
BirdLife Species Factsheet.

ash-breasted tit-tyrant
Birds of the Peruvian Andes
ash-breasted tit-tyrant
Taxonomy articles created by Polbot